Lois Plous (born August 14, 1938 in Milwaukee, Wisconsin.) served as a member of the Wisconsin State Assembly. She graduated from Washington High School and the University of Wisconsin–Milwaukee. Plous has two children.

Career
Plous was first elected to the Assembly in a special election on April 29, 1980. She is a Democrat.

References

Politicians from Milwaukee
Democratic Party members of the Wisconsin State Assembly
Women state legislators in Wisconsin
University of Wisconsin–Milwaukee alumni
1938 births
Living people
21st-century American women